Patricio Alberto Rey Sommer (born 27 March 1978), is a Chilean civil industrial engineer, and former Intendant of O'Higgins Region.

Biography
He began his studies at Instituto San Fernando, in San Fernando. Between 1994-95, he studied at Chillicothe High School in Ohio, United States of America.

He graduated as a Civil Industrial Engineer with a Degree in Engineering of Informatics at the Pontifical Catholic University of Chile, and in 2003 he obtained a Master in Sciences of Engineering at the same university.

Political career
He worked in Serplac of O'Higgins Region, and was SEREMI of Planning, in the same region. On 19 April 2011, he took over Rodrigo Pérez Mackenna's position as intendant of O'Higgins Region.

References

1978 births
Instituto San Fernando alumni
Pontifical Catholic University of Chile alumni
Chilean politicians
Living people
Intendants of O'Higgins Region